German submarine U-141 was a Type IID U-boat of Nazi Germany's Kriegsmarine during World War II. Her keel was laid down on 12 December 1939 by Deutsche Werke in Kiel as yard number 270. She was launched on 27 July 1940 and commissioned on 21 August 1940 with Oberleutnant zur See Heinz-Otto Schultze in command.

U-141 began her service life with the 1st U-boat Flotilla. She was then assigned to the 3rd flotilla and subsequently to the 21st flotilla where she conducted four patrols, sinking four ships and damaging another, between May and September 1941. She spent the rest of the war as a training vessel, moving over to the 31st flotilla.

She was scuttled on 5 May 1945.

Design
German Type IID submarines were enlarged versions of the original Type IIs. U-141 had a displacement of  when at the surface and  while submerged. She had two shafts and two  propellers.

U-141 was fitted with three  torpedo tubes at the bow, five torpedoes or up to twelve Type A torpedo mines, and a  anti-aircraft gun. The boat had a complement of 25.

Operational career
The U-boat began her operational career with a trip from Kiel to Bergen in Norway in April 1941.

First patrol
The submarine's first patrol commenced with her departure from Bergen on 29 April 1941. Her destination was Lorient in occupied France which she reached, having crossed the North Sea and made her way north of the Faroe Islands, on 11 May. During the voyage, she was unsuccessfully attacked by a Lockheed Hudson of No. 269 Squadron RAF west of the Outer Hebrides.

Second patrol

Third patrol
She damaged Atlantic City and sank Botney on 26 July 1941, west of Bloody Foreland, (also in Ireland).

Fourth patrol
U-141s last sortie took her north of Northern Ireland where she sank Jarlinn and King Erik in September 1941.

Summary of raiding history

References

Bibliography

External links

1940 ships
German Type II submarines
Ships built in Kiel
U-boats commissioned in 1940
World War II submarines of Germany
Operation Regenbogen (U-boat)
Maritime incidents in May 1945